The 1990 Trans-Am Series was the 25th running of the Sports Car Club of America's Trans-Am Series. Tommy Kendall won his first of four driver's championships, driving a Spice Engineering-run Chevrolet Beretta.

Results

Championship standings (Top 10)

References

Trans-Am Series
Trans-Am